The Port Chalmers Branch was the first railway line built in Otago, New Zealand, and linked the region's major city of Dunedin with the port in Port Chalmers. The line is still operational today.

Construction and early history
Built by the Dunedin and Port Chalmers Railway Company Limited during 1872, the line was approved by and constructed under the auspices of the Otago Provincial Council, not the central government. The line was formally opened by Sir George Bowen, former Governor of New Zealand, on a farewell trip prior to his transfer to Victoria. Not long after opening, the central Government purchased the Dunedin and Port Chalmers Railway Company for £150,000, with the transaction completed in May 1873. Otago Provincial Council was abolished along with the other provincial councils of New Zealand in 1876.

The first locomotive to run on the line – and the first  gauge locomotive to operate in New Zealand – was the E class Josephine, a double Fairlie steam locomotive. Local popularity ensured the locomotive was retained beyond its retirement from service on in 1917 and is preserved today in the Otago Settlers Museum in Dunedin.

Much of the Port Chalmers line is now part of the Main South Line from Christchurch to Dunedin. When the first section of the mainline, from Dunedin to Waitati, opened in December 1877 a junction was established at Sawyers Bay. The section from Dunedin to Sawyers Bay became part of the Main South Line, while the remaining two kilometres to Port Chalmers became the Port Chalmers Branch. In 1880 the line was vested in the newly established New Zealand Railways Department, and the private company dissolved.

Operation

Passenger services 

Suburban passenger services were run from Dunedin on the line for over 100 years, but ceased at the end of 1979. These were usually locomotive-hauled carriage trains, but infrequently, RM class Vulcan railcars were used too. Occasional passenger services were operated by Dunedin Railways to meet cruise ships and carry tourists through the scenic Taieri Gorge on the preserved portion of the Otago Central Railway, but these services have been mothballed since mid-2020.

Freight services 

The main reason for the lines existence is freight to and from the port, and as the shipping industry has changed, so has the traffic on the line.  It has evolved from nineteenth century imports of supplies and exports of produce from rural Otago's farms and businesses into today's long-distance containerised freight.  The line remains an important link in New Zealand's transport infrastructure and trains are operated by KiwiRail.  The Taieri Gorge Railway recently sought a contract to haul logs from a location in the Taieri Gorge to Port Chalmers, but insufficient subsidies meant the venture would not have been cost efficient. In 2012 KiwiRail once again sought subsidies from the Otago Regional Council to move logs through the port, noting that there were annually 450,000 tonnes of logs in the area south of Dunedin available for processing. The volume of logs equated to 15,000 truck movements inwards. For up to $1.5 million, connecting the site to the Main South Line would reduce truck movements by 7,500 each year, KiwiRail submitted.

It estimated 400,000 tonnes of logs (about 13,000 log truck movements) were sent to Port Otago each year and better opportunities to transfer logs to and from rail could reduce truck traffic on State Highway 88 by up to 6500 movements annually. KiwiRail also noted it had increased its Otago operations, carrying 320,000 tonnes, up from 150,000 tonnes in 2010. This was mainly due to increases in freight dispatched by Fonterra from its Edendale and Mosgiel operations.

Motive power 

Motive power has often been provided by shunting locomotives rather than larger mainline engines.  At the start of the twentieth century, small tank locomotives such as members of the FA class were used.  However, in the 1960s, as diesel locomotives replaced steam locomotives on the main lines, large engines such as members of the AB class operated the suburban trains to Port Chalmers.

References

Citations

Bibliography

 
 
 Hermann, Bruce J; South Island Branch Lines p 26 (1997, New Zealand Railway & Locomotive Society, Wellington)

External links
Photo of locomotive Josephine at Dunedin

 

Railway lines in New Zealand
Rail transport in Dunedin
Railway lines opened in 1873
Port Chalmers
3 ft 6 in gauge railways in New Zealand